4th Politburo may refer to:
4th Central Bureau of the Chinese Communist Party
4th Politburo of the Communist Party of Cuba
4th Politburo of the Party of Labour of Albania
4th Politburo of the Communist Party of Czechoslovakia
4th Politburo of the Socialist Unity Party of Germany
4th Politburo of the Polish United Workers' Party
4th Politburo of the Romanian Communist Party
4th Politburo of the Lao People's Revolutionary Party
4th Politburo of the Communist Party of Vietnam
4th Politburo of the Communist Party of Yugoslavia
4th Politburo of the Hungarian Working People's Party
4th Political Committee of the Workers' Party of Korea